Derek James Monaghan (born 20 January 1959) is an English former footballer who played as a forward for West Bromwich Albion, Port Vale, and Redditch United.

Career
Monaghan started his career at West Bromwich Albion in 1979. He scored two goals in nineteen First Division matches during a five-year stay. He suffered with knee injuries at The Hawthorns, but after two years on the sidelines he returned to action in time to score a winning goal against Arsenal at Highbury in December 1983; however he was again struck down by injury a week later. He played under four different managers: Ron Atkinson, Ronnie Allen, Ron Wylie, and Johnny Giles, before joining John Rudge's Port Vale in July 1984. He played seven Fourth Division and two cup games in the 1984–85 season, but suffered badly with injuries. He was given a free transfer in May 1985 and moved on to Redditch United. United won promotion out of the Southern Football League Midland Division in 1985–86.

Post-retirement
After retiring as a footballer, Monaghan set up his own financial consultancy business in Warwickshire.

Career statistics
Source:

Honours
Redditch United
Southern Football League Midland Division second-place promotion: 1985–86

References

1959 births
Living people
Sportspeople from Bromsgrove
English footballers
Association football forwards
West Bromwich Albion F.C. players
Port Vale F.C. players
Redditch United F.C. players
English Football League players